Delias georgina  is a butterfly in the family Pieridae. It was described by Cajetan Felder and Rudolf Felder in 1861. It is found in the Indomalayan realm, where it has been recorded from the Philippines (Luzon).

References

External links
Delias at Markku Savela's Lepidoptera and Some Other Life Forms

georgina
Butterflies described in 1861
Butterflies of Asia
Taxa named by Baron Cajetan von Felder
Taxa named by Rudolf Felder